Muhammad Hairi Amin bin Hamdan (born July 27, 1996), known professionally as MK K-Clique (briefly Hairi Whuut), is a Malaysian rapper, media personality, and actor. He is a group member of K-Clique, a Sabahan-based group. His fame dates to 2018 when his group, K-Clique release their song titled Lane Lain Line on YouTube and got their most streamed artist on Spotify in 2019. In 2020, He and his fellow members got nominated for Best Southeast Asia Act in 2020 MTV Europe Music Awards (EMA).

After several years in the music and actor industry, MK has announced his own clothing brands, Three O' Two. The brand's name inspired from a Penal Code Section 302 in the Laws of Malaysia: Act 574. where he always put those numbers in his song.

This network concept is based on streetwear clothing by his own inspiration and the helps of his creative teams.

After one year in the mainstream industry, in 2019 his Instagram account reached one million followers.

Personal life 
MK or his full name Muhammad Hairi Amin bin Hamdan or mostly known as Hairi or Mat among his close friends was born on 27 July 1996 at Tawau General Hospital, Tawau, Sabah. When Hairi was very young, he was raised in a remote village called Tanjung Batu Tengah, almost ten minutes from the Tawau town. He is the seventh child from eight siblings, six eldest sisters and one younger brother. Two of his siblings has passed away. He graduated from Universiti Teknologi MARA (UiTM), Kota Kinabalu campus in Sabah. During his study, he and his friends—Noki, Tuju, Somean, KDeaf, FareedPF, Gnello dan NastyNas form a Rap group called K-Clique.

Before becoming a celebrity, he admitted that he had been working as a tow truck while waiting for a job offer after graduation. At that time, he had just finished his studies at the diploma level. But he failed to find a job, making him work as a car puller for two years.

Discography 

Single with K-Clique

Collaboration/Featuring with other artists

Filmography

Film

Drama

Television

Music Video

Awards

References 

1997 births
21st-century Malaysian actors
21st-century Malaysian male singers
Sabah musicians
Living people